James Frederick Thrower (born November 6, 1947) is a former American football defensive back. 

Thrower was born in Camden, Arkansas, in 1947. He attended Lincoln High School and played college football at Texas A&M–Commerce. 

Thrower played professional football as a defensive back in the National Football League (NFL) for the Philadelphia Eagles from 1970 to 1972.  He was fired by the Eagles in November 1972.

He next played for the Detroit Lions during the 1973 and 1974 seasons. While with the Lions, he was a backup to cornerback Lem Barney and also served as captain of the special team unit.  He was also a member of the Fellowship of Christian Athletes. During the 1975, was placed on the injured reserve list. The Detroit Free Press called him the captain of the injured reserve list.

In three years in the NFL, Thrower appeared in a total of 46 NFL games, four of them as a starter. 

After retiring from football, Thrower worked for the Stroh Brewery Co. and later Michigan Consolidated Gas Co. He was also a leading fundraiser for the NAACP.

References

1947 births
Living people
American football defensive backs
Philadelphia Eagles players
Detroit Lions players
Texas A&M–Commerce Lions football players
Players of American football from Arkansas
People from Camden, Arkansas